The Beeches may refer to:

 Beeches (Frankfort, Kentucky), a brick house in Frankfort, Kentucky, listed on the National Register of Historic Places
 The Beeches (Springfield, Tennessee), a historic mansion in Springfield, Tennessee, listed on the National Register of Historic Places
 The Beeches (St. Albans, West Virginia), a historic home located at St. Albans, West Virginia, listed on the National Register of Historic Places
 The Beeches (painting), an 1845 painting by Asher Brown Durand

See also
 Beech (disambiguation)
 Beach (disambiguation)
 The Beach (disambiguation)